Hypergiant is an Austin, Texas based technology company, founded in February 2018, and currently headed by CEO Mike Betzer.

The company develops artificial intelligence (AI) products, focused on its CommandCenter Platform: CommandCenter is a geospatial Intelligent Insights & Actions Platform designed for AI that enables users to get from data to decision faster. The platform supports a myriad of real-time moving entities and data formats in an ultra high-performant (60-120 fps) front-end that has been pressure-tested and deployed in secure (IL4 & IL6) client production environments.

In August 2019, global consulting firm Booz Allen announced a venture with Hypergiant to deliver AI solutions for public sector clients.  In September 2019, its algae-based air cleaner, was noted by Fast Company as a "world-changing idea", and was reviewed in Popular Mechanics, and other media.

References

External links
Official website

Companies based in Austin, Texas
2018 establishments in Texas
American companies established in 2018
Privately held companies based in Texas